Diana Margaret Maddock, Baroness Maddock, Lady Beith (19 May 1945 – 26 June 2020) was a British Liberal Democrat politician. She was elected as Member of Parliament (MP) for Christchurch in a 1993 by-election but lost the seat at the subsequent 1997 general election to Conservative Christopher Chope. She re-entered Parliament as a life peer as Baroness Maddock, of Christchurch in the County of Dorset, in 1997 where she remained until her death.

Early life and early career
Diana Maddock (née Derbyshire)  was born on 19 May 1945 to parents Reginald Derbyshire and Margaret Evans. She was educated at Shenstone Training College and Portsmouth Polytechnic (now the University of Portsmouth) and was a teacher of English as a foreign language until starting a family and becoming involved in politics in the mid-1970s. She spent some time teaching in Sweden and she credited her time living there as an influence on her political beliefs and went on to serve as President of the Anglo-Swedish Society from 1999 until her death.

Political career
Maddock joined the Liberal Party in 1976, and was elected to Southampton City Council in 1984. Maddock was not particularly political in her early life. She highlights her initial involvement came when she was pregnant and approached by a canvasser who convinced her to join the Liberal Party having voted for them previously. As she had stopped work, she had more time to be civically engaged which expanded to the point where she became involved with the Association of Liberal Councillors which promoted active engagement with community groups and she realised she enjoyed campaigning.

During her time on the City Council, she was leader of the Liberal Democrat group on the council. She unsuccessfully contested Southampton Test at the 1992 general election, coming third. She was elected as Member of Parliament for Christchurch at a by-election in 1993 that was caused by the death of Robert Adley, but lost the seat at the 1997 election to the Conservative candidate Christopher Chope.

She was created a life peer as Baroness Maddock, of Christchurch in the County of Dorset on 30 October 1997. From 1998 to 2000, she was President of the Liberal Democrats.

In 2005, she was elected a member of Northumberland County Council for Berwick North Division and in 2007 also to Berwick-upon-Tweed Borough Council for Edward Ward.

Maddock did not re-stand for election to the County Council at the expiry of her term in 2008 and the Borough Council was abolished in 2009 and absorbed into Northumberland County Council.

Areas of policy interest 
While on Southampton City Council Maddock's primary areas of interest were housing and energy conservation.

Personal life
She married Bob Maddock in 1966. The marriage ended in divorce. She married secondly Alan Beith, the then MP for Berwick-upon-Tweed, in 2001. She and her husband were one of the few couples who each held peerages in their own right. She died on 26 June 2020 aged 75 at her home in Berwick-upon Tweed, Northumberland.

References

External links 
 
Baroness Maddock profile at the site of Liberal Democrats

1945 births
2020 deaths
Liberal Democrats (UK) MPs for English constituencies
Councillors in Northumberland
Presidents of the Liberal Democrats (UK)
Female members of the Parliament of the United Kingdom for English constituencies
UK MPs 1992–1997
Liberal Democrats (UK) life peers
Life peeresses created by Elizabeth II
Spouses of life peers
Wives of knights
Alumni of the University of Portsmouth
20th-century British women politicians
21st-century British women politicians
Liberal Democrats (UK) councillors
Members of the Parliament of the United Kingdom for constituencies in Dorset
Women councillors in England